The following is a timeline of the history of the city of Ravenna in the Emilia-Romagna region of Italy.

Prior to 20th century

 191 BCE - Romans in power in region.
 1st-3rd century CE - Roman Catholic diocese of Ravenna established.
 402 CE - Capital of the Western Roman Empire relocated to Ravenna from Milan (until 476).
 425 CE - San Giovanni Evangelista church construction begins.
 476 - Odoacer in power.
 493 - Theoderic the Great in power.
 505 - Arian Sant'Apollinare Nuovo church construction begins.
 520 - Mausoleum of Theoderic built near town.
 526 -  (church) built.
 540 - Forces of Byzantine Belisarius take Ravenna.
 547 - Basilica of San Vitale consecrated.
 549 - Basilica of Sant'Apollinare in Classe consecrated near Ravenna.
 584 - Exarchate of Ravenna established (approximate date).
 751 - Lombards in power.
 777 - Ravenna under rule of the Holy See.
967 - Imperial Diet held by Otto II, Holy Roman Emperor
 1441 - Venetians in power.
 1512 - Battle of Ravenna (1512) fought near town during the War of the League of Cambrai.
 1737 - Canale Candiano (canal) to Adriatic Sea created.
 1752 - Società Letteraria Ravennate (learned society) founded.
 1804 - Biblioteca Classense (library) established.
 1820/21 - Home of Lord Byron for eighteen months.
 1826 - Accademia filarmonica (music academy) founded.
 1849 - Anita Garibaldi succumbed to fatigue during the retreat from Rome.
 1852 - Teatro Comunale Alighieri opens.
 1859 - Papal rule ends.
 1860 - Ravenna becomes part of the Kingdom of Piedmont.
 1863 - Ravenna railway station opens.
 1881 - Population: 34,270.
 1897 - Population: 67,760.

20th century

 1911 - Population: 71,581.
 1913 - Unione Sportiva Ravennate (football club) formed.
 1921 -  (railway) begins operating.
 1927 -  (library) established.
 1966 - Stadio Bruno Benelli (stadium) opens.
 1983 -  (theatre group) formed.
 1990 - Ravenna Festival of music begins.
 1997 - Vidmer Mercatali becomes mayor.

21st century

 2006 -  becomes mayor.
 2011 - Some of the 2011 FIFA Beach Soccer World Cup played in Ravenna.
 2013 - Population: 154,288.
 2014 - November: Emilia-Romagna regional election, 2014 held.
 2016 - June: Italian local elections, 2016 held; Michele De Pascale becomes mayor.

See also
 Ravenna history
 
 Classe, ancient port of Ravenna
 List of mayors of Ravenna
 List of bishops of Ravenna

Timelines of other cities in the macroregion of Northeast Italy:(it)
 Emilia-Romagna region: Timeline of Bologna; Ferrara; Forlì; Modena; Parma; Piacenza; Reggio Emilia; Rimini
 Friuli-Venezia Giulia region: Timeline of Trieste
 Trentino-South Tyrol region: Timeline of Trento
 Veneto region: Timeline of Padua; Treviso; Venice; Verona; Vicenza

References

This article incorporates information from the Italian Wikipedia.

Bibliography

 . 9th century

in English
 
 
 
 
 
 
 
 
 Edward Hutton. The Story of Ravenna. Great Britain: J.M. Dent and Sons Limited, 1926
 A. J. Wharton. Refiguring the Post Classical City: Dura Europos, Jerash, Jerusalem, and Ravenna (Cambridge, 1995)

in Italian

External links

  (city archives)
 Archivio di Stato di Ravenna (state archives)
 Items related to Ravenna, various dates (via Europeana)
 Items related to Ravenna, various dates (via Digital Public Library of America)

Ravenna
Ravenna
ravenna